Barbari bread is a type of yeast leavened Hazara flatbread. It is one of the thickest flat breads and is commonly topped with sesame or black caraway seeds. A notable characteristic of the bread is its top skin that is similar to pretzels or lye roll's skin due to the Maillard reaction that occurs during baking. Before baking it is glazed with a mixture of baking soda, flour and water. 
It is widely known as Persian flatbread in United States and Canada.

Etymology 
Barbari is an obsolete Persian term for the Hazara people living in Khorasan, Iran. Barbari bread was first baked by Hazaras and taken to Tehran, becoming popular during the Qajar dynasty. Hazaras are no longer called barbari (i.e. Easterners), as Hazara people were called barbar or barbarian in Iran. It is popular among Iranian Azerbaijanis.

Manufacture and style 
The bread is usually 70 cm to 80 cm long, and 25 cm to 30 cm wide. It is the most common style baked in Iran. It is served in many restaurants with Lighvan cheese, a ewe's milk cheese similar to feta cheese.

See also
 Naan
 Taftan, Iranian bread
 Sangak, a leavened Iranian flatbread
 Lavash, an unleavened Armenian flatbread popular in Iran

References

Flatbreads
Iranian breads